Louis Berkhof (October 13, 1873 – May 18, 1957) was a Dutch-American Reformed theologian whose works on systematic theology have been influential in seminaries and Bible colleges in the United States, Canada, Korea and with individual Christians in general throughout the 20th century.

Personal life
Berkhof was born in 1873 in Emmen in the Netherlands and moved in 1882 with his family to Grand Rapids (Michigan). About the time he graduated from the seminary he married Reka Dijkhuis. They had four children before her death in 1928. He then married Dena Heyns-Joldersma who had two daughters.

Education and career
Berkhof entered the Theological School of the Christian Reformed Church in Grand Rapids at the age of 19, in which the studies included a 4-year literary course (expanded into Calvin College) and a 3-year theological course (expanded into Calvin Theological Seminary). During this period, he learnt under Hendericus Beuker who introduced him to the works of Abraham Kuyper and Herman Bavinck. In 1900, he graduated from the seminary in Grand Rapids after which he was appointed pastor of the First Christian Reformed Church in Allendale Charter Township, Michigan.

Two years later (1902), he attended Princeton Theological Seminary where he earned his B.D. in two years. He studied under B.B. Warfield and Geerhardus Vos during his time in Princeton. Subsequently, Berkhof returned to Grand Rapids to minister at the Oakdale Park Church for another two years.

In 1906, he joined the faculty of Calvin Theological Seminary and taught there for almost four decades. For the first 20 years he taught Biblical Studies until in 1926 he moved into the systematic theology department. He became president of the seminary in 1931 and continued in that office until he retired in 1944.

Publications
Berkhof wrote twenty-two books during his career. His main works are his Systematic Theology (1932, revised 1938) which was supplemented with an Introductory Volume to Systematic Theology (1932, which is included in the 1996 Eerdman's edition of Systematic Theology) and a separate volume entitled History of Christian Doctrines (1937). 
He wrote a more concise version of his Systematic Theology for high school and college students entitled Manual of Christian Doctrine, and later wrote the even more concise Summary of Christian Doctrine. He also delivered Princeton Theological Seminary's Stone Lectures in 1921. These were published as The Kingdom of God. In addition to this, he worked on many papers for the Christian Reformed Church as well as collections of sermons.

Bibliography of Works in English
Life Under the Law in a Pure Theocracy: or, The Significance of the Book of Judges (Grand Rapids: Eerdmans-Sevensma, 1913)
The church and social problems (Grand Rapids: Eerdmans-Sevensma, 1913)
Biblical archeology (Grand Rapids: Eerdmans-Sevensma, 1915)
Paul the Missionary (Grand Rapids: Eerdmans-Sevensma, 1915)
New Testament introduction (or special canonics) (Grand Rapids: Eerdmans-Sevensma, 1915)
The Christian laborer in the industrial struggle (Grand Rapids: Eerdmans-Sevensma, 1916)
Subjects and outlines (Grand Rapids: Eerdmans-Sevensma, 1918)
Why Reformed Young Men's Societies? Address delivered at the 10th annual convention of the American Federation of Reformed Young Men's Societies, October 10, 1929 (Chicago: American Federation of Reformed Young Men's Societies, 1929)
Manual of Reformed doctrine (Grand Rapids: Wm. B. Eerdmans Pub. Co., 1931)
Reformed Dogmatics (Grand Rapids: Eerdmans, 1932)
Vicarious atonement through Christ (Grand Rapids: Wm. B. Eerdmans Pub. Co., 1936)
History of dogma (Grand Rapids: Wm. B. Eerdmans Pub. Co., 1937)
Summary of Christian doctrine for senior classes (Grand Rapids: Wm. B. Eerdmans Pub. Co., 1938)
Assurance of Faith (Grand Rapids, Wm. B. Eerdmans Pub. Co., 1939)
Systematic theology (Grand Rapids: Wm. B. Eerdmans Pub. Co., 1941)
Recent trends in theology (Grand Rapids: Wm. B. Eerdmans Pub. Co., 1944)
Riches of divine grace; ten expository sermons (Grand Rapids, Wm. B. Eerdmans Pub. Co., 1948)
Principles of Biblical interpretation: sacred hermeneutics (Grand Rapids: Baker Book House, 1950)
Aspects of liberalism (Grand Rapids: Eerdmans, 1951)
Kingdom of God: the development of the idea of the kingdom, especially since the eighteenth century (Grand Rapids: Eerdmans, 1951)
The second coming of Christ (Grand Rapids: Wm. B. Eerdmans Pub. Co., 1953)
History of Christian doctrines (London: Banner of Truth Trust, 1969)

Legacy
Berkhof was not known for being original or speculative but for being very good at organizing and explaining basic theological ideas following in the tradition of John Calvin, Abraham Kuyper and Herman Bavinck. Theologian Wayne Grudem has called Berkhof's Systematic Theology "a great treasure-house of information and analysis [...] probably the most useful one-volume systematic theology available from any theological perspective." Berkhof's writings continue to serve as systematic presentations of Reformed theology. They are organized for use in seminaries and religious education as well as individual reference, though his systematics works are demanding reads.

One of the prominent students of Berkhof is Cornelius Van Til, whose thoughts became the major position of the tradition of Westminster Theological Seminary in the areas of apologetics and epistemology.

References

External links
 L. Berkhof, Systematic Theology
 L. Berkhof, Summary of Christian Doctrine (This is a complete, free e-book edition.)
 L. Berkhof, Manual of Christian Doctrine (This is a complete, free e-book edition.)
 `Louis Berkhof´, op website http://www.calvin.edu
 G. Kirkland (2009), Louis Berkhof: an Ardent Apologist, a Passionate Pastor, and a Scrupulous Scholar (pdf), website http://vassaloftheking.com
 F. Klooster, `Louis Berkhof´ (pdf), in: W. Elwell (1993), Handbook of Evangelical Theologicans, pp. 254–294, website: https://web.archive.org/web/20140220061509/http://www.davidcox.com.mx/
 H. Zwaanstra, `Louis Berkhof´, in: D. Wells (1985), Reformed Theology in America. A History of its Modern Development, pp. 153–71, website https://books.google.com/

1873 births
1957 deaths
20th-century Calvinist and Reformed theologians
American Calvinist and Reformed theologians
Dutch Calvinist and Reformed theologians
People from Emmen, Netherlands
Dutch emigrants to the United States
Princeton Theological Seminary alumni
Presidents of Calvinist and Reformed seminaries
Calvin Theological Seminary faculty
Calvin Theological Seminary alumni